is a Japanese company based in Osaka. Primarily, the company produces various textiles, glass, plastics, and carbon fiber products. They are also known for their films, which are used in consumer products like athletic apparel and food packaging.

As of July 2009, they gained notoriety when they announced their new plastic, which exceeds ABS (acrylonitrile butadiene styrene) in terms of carbon emissions during production and heat/impact durability.

Unitika has 46 subsidiary companies across Japan, in Thailand, Vietnam, Indonesia, China, Hong Kong, Brazil and the US. The company is listed on the first section of the Tokyo Stock Exchange and the Osaka Securities Exchange and is a constituent of the Nikkei 225 stock index.

Business segments and products
 Polymers
 Films
 Resins and plastic molding
 Nonwoven
 Biomass-based material (Terramac)
 Advanced materials
 Glass cloth
 Glass beads
 Activated carbon fiber
 Metallic fiber
 Thermosetting resin
 Aromatic polyimide
 Fibers and Textiles
 Industrial materials
 Garments, lifestyle materials, bedding
 Biomass-based material (Terramac)
 Health and Amenity
 Health
 Medical
 Others
 Environmental survey and analysis
 Real estate services, operation of leisure facilities (such as swimming schools and golf courses), software design, and mechanical parking facilities

Gallery

References

External links
 Official global website 
 Products list 

Chemical companies of Japan
Textile companies of Japan
Companies listed on the Tokyo Stock Exchange
Companies listed on the Osaka Exchange
Chemical companies established in 1889
Japanese companies established in 1889
Science and technology in Japan
Manufacturing companies based in Osaka
Japanese brands
Midori-kai